Year of the Devil is a 2002 Czech mockumentary film directed by Petr Zelenka. It stars musicians who act as themselves: Czech folk music band Čechomor, musicians and poets Jaromír Nohavica, Karel Plihal and British musician and composer Jaz Coleman. The soundtrack also includes two pieces by the Killing Joke: Frenzy and Exorcism.

Plot
Dutch documentary film director, Jan Holman, goes to the Czech Republic to make a film about curing alcoholism. At an Alcoholics Anonymous meeting he finds a man named Jaromir Nohavica who becomes his friend. Another friend of Nohavica, Karel Plihal, becomes mute, and Nohavica decides to start a tour with the band Čechomor to help cure him. When Jan Holman follows with his camera in tow, he finds many inexplicable events along the way.

Awards and nominations 
It was awarded the Crystal Globe at the 37th Karlovy Vary International Film Festival and won the Findling Award and the FIPRESCI Prize at the Cottbus Film Festival of Young East European Cinema in 2002. In 2003 it won 6 Czech Lions, including Best Film, Best Director, Best Editing, and was nominated for 5 more, including Best Screenplay and Best Cinematography. In the same year it won the Prize Trieste at the Trieste Film Festival.

External links 
 Official pages of the film 
 Official pages of the film 
 

2002 comedy films
2002 films
Czech comedy films
2000s Czech-language films
Crystal Globe winners
2000s Dutch-language films
Docufiction films
Documentary films about rock music and musicians
Films directed by Petr Zelenka
2000s German-language films
Czech musical films
Czech Lion Awards winners (films)
Spontaneous human combustion in fiction
2002 multilingual films
Czech multilingual films
2000s Czech films
German-language Czech films